Grünberg is a town in the district of Gießen, in Hessen, Germany. In 1980, the town hosted the 20th Hessentag state festival.

Geography 

Neighbouring communities 
To the north Grünberg borders the municipality Rabenau and the town Homberg (Ohm) (Vogelsbergkreis), to the east the municipality Mücke (Vogelsbergkreis), to the south the town Laubach and to the west the municipality Reiskirchen.

Constituent communities 
The town of Grünberg also consists of the nearby villages of Beltershain, Göbelnrod, Harbach, Klein-Eichen, Lardenbach, Lehnheim, Lumda, Queckborn, Reinhardshain, Stangenrod, Stockhausen, Weickartshain and Weitershain.

International relations 

 Condom, southwestern France – since 1973
 Mrągowo, northeastern Poland – since 1993

Education 

 Theo-Koch-School, Grünberg – integrated comprehensive school with sixth form
 primary school Am Diebsturm, Grünberg
 primary school Sonnenberg, Stangenrod
 Gallus-School, Grünberg

Transport 
Grünberg has a junction of the Bundesautobahn 5. There are stations on the Vogelsberg Railway (Vogelsbergbahn) in the town of Grünberg (Grünberg station) and the villages Göbelnrod (Göbelnrod station) and Lehnheim (Lehnheim station).

Gallery

References

External links 
 
 Foto Gallery - Fotos von Grunberg

Giessen (district)